This is a list of all 270  and 115  inside of or bordering Indonesia. Ribus are mountains with a topographic prominence greater than 1000 meters.  are Indonesian peaks with less than 1000 meters of topographic prominence, but of significant touristic interest.
The Indonesian words utara, barat, selatan, timur means north, west, south and east accordingly.

Ribus and Spesials in Bali

Ribus and Spesials in Banten

Ribus and Spesials in Bengkulu

Ribus and Spesials in Gorontalo

Ribus and Spesials in Jambi

Ribus and Spesials in Jawa Barat

Ribus and Spesials in Jawa Tengah

Ribus and Spesials in Jawa Timur

Ribus and Spesials in Kalimantan Barat

Ribus and Spesials in Kalimantan Selatan

Ribus and Spesials in Kalimantan Tengah

Ribus and Spesials in Kalimantan Timur

Ribus and Spesials in Kepulauan Riau

Ribus and Spesials in Lampung

Ribus and Spesials in Maluku

Ribus and Spesials in Maluku Utara

Ribus and Spesials in Nanggroe Aceh Darussalam

Ribus and Spesials in Nusa Tenggara Barat

Ribus and Spesials in Nusa Tenggara Timur

Ribus and Spesials in Papua

Ribus and Spesials in Papua Barat

Spesials in Sabah

Spesials in Sarawak

Ribus and Spesials in Sulawesi Barat

Ribus and Spesials in Sulawesi Selatan

Ribus and Spesials in Sulawesi Tengah

Ribus and Spesials in Sulawesi Tenggara

Ribus and Spesials in Sulawesi Utara

Ribus and Spesials in Sumatera Barat

Ribus and Spesials in Sumatera Selatan

Ribus and Spesials in Sumatera Utara

Spesials in Timor Leste

See also
 List of peaks by prominence
 List of volcanoes in Indonesia

References

External links
 List of Ribus on Gunung Bagging hiking site
 Feature in the Jakarta Post newspaper

Lists of mountains of Asia
Lists of mountains by elevation